At the Chinese Academy of Sciences, new members are elected biennially. Before 2014 only a maximum of 60 members could be inducted each time, but this restriction has since been removed by new bylaws. The candidates are nominated by current members or academic groups, although foreign members and senior members cannot nominate new candidates. Self nomination is also not allowed.
Available candidates are approved by presidiums of academic divisions. Elections are held by secret ballots, and about 20% of the candidates are elected.

The membership system has been criticized as highly bureaucratic. Academicians receive government benefits equivalent to those enjoyed by vice-ministerial level officials. Additionally, academicians can receive numerous subsidies from the local governments in addition to statutory subsidies. Their opinions may carry more weight, which sometimes leads to academic monopolization.

As of September 2014, there are 738 living academicians across different divisions. 141 members constitute the Division of Mathematics and Physics, 126 in the Division of Chemistry, 136 in the Division of Life Sciences and Medicine, 122 in the Division of Earth Sciences, 86 in the Division of Information Technical Sciences, and 131 in the Division of Technological Sciences. 507 former members are deceased. 94% of the members are male, and 6% are female.

Division of Mathematics and Physics
1955
 
1957

1980

1991

1993

1995

1997

1999

2001

2003

2005

2007

2009

2011

2013

2015

2017

2019

Division of Chemistry
1955

1957

1980

1991

1993

1995

1997

1999

2001

2003

2005

2007

2009

2011

2013

2015

2017

2019

Division of Life Sciences and Medicine
1955

1957

1980

1991

1993

1995

1997

1999

2001

2003

2005

2007

2009

2011

2013

2015

2017

2019

Division of Earth Sciences
1955

1957

1980

1991

1993

1995

1997

1999

2001

2003

2005

2007

2009

2011

2013

2015

2017

2019

Division of Information Technical Sciences
1955
Wang Daheng
1980

1991

1993

1995

1997

1999

2001

2003

2005

2007
Wu Yirong
2009

2011

2013

2015

2017

2019

Division of Technological Sciences
1955

1957

1980

1991

1993

1995

1997

1999

2001

2003

2005

2007

2009

2011

2013

2015

2017

2019

References